The term federalist describes any of several political beliefs around the world, or the concept various parties; its members or supporters calling themselves "Federalists".

Federalist may also refer to:

Federalist architecture, the name for the classicizing architecture built in the newly founded United States between c. 1780 and 1830, and particularly from 1785 to 1815
Maryland Federalist, a replica of the 18th-century miniature ship Federalist
The Federalist Papers, or The Federalist, a collection of articles or essays promoting the ratification of the United States Constitution
The Federalist (website), a conservative U.S. political website
The Federalists, SFBA-based U.S. indie rock band

Political parties 

Federalist Party in the United States
Federalist Party (Philippines)
Federalist Alliance of Italy
Federalist Unity Party of Argentina
Democratic Party of Federalists of Bosnia
Union of Federalists and Independent Republicans of Congo
Breton Federalist League
Union of Federalist Nationalists of Congo
Hungarian Federalist Party
Federalist Italian League
Turkic Federalist Party
Tuscan Federalist Alliance
The Federalist Party of the Yale Political Union

See also
Federalist Society for Law and Public Policy Studies, U.S. society seeking legal reform in the U.S.
Federalist Era (1789–1801), U.S. political era
:Category:Federalism
 Federalism
Anti-Federalist of the U.S.
Anti-Federalist League of Britain
Federalist revolts of 1793 in France
 Federal (disambiguation)
 Federation (disambiguation)
 Federalism (disambiguation)
 Federal Union (disambiguation)